"She Sells Sanctuary" is a song by British rock band the Cult. It is from their second studio album, Love (1985), and was released as a single on 13 May 1985, peaking at number 15 on the UK Singles Chart in July of the same year. In July 2020, the British Phonographic Industry (BPI) awarded the song a gold certification for sales and streams of over 400,000. In January 1993, the song was re-released as "Sanctuary MCMXCIII" and experienced chart success once more, matching its original peak on the UK Singles Chart and entering the top 10 in New Zealand.

"She Sells Sanctuary" was the last song to be recorded with the Cult's longtime drummer, Nigel Preston, who was fired from the band shortly after its release. According to Cult guitarist Billy Duffy, the iconic introduction effects were the result of all the guitar effects pedals being on at the same time. The recording was edited to include the introduction with the effects, whereas earlier versions started the song more abruptly. Duffy says he found a violin bow lying around the studio and started playing the guitar with it "like Jimmy Page" to amuse singer Ian Astbury, hit every effects pedal he had "to make it sound weirder", and then played the middle section of the song. "And we decided to start the song with that mystical sound. If I hadn't found that violin bow laying around, we wouldn't have gone there," said Duffy.

Release
After its release in 1985, the single reached number 36 during a six-week run on the US Billboard Hot Dance/Club Play chart in 1986. The band has released various versions of the song. Aside from the original 7-inch single, three other versions had been released around the same time on 12-inch formats: "The Long Version", "The Howling Mix" and "Assault on Sanctuary".

On 18 January 1993, several more mixes were released on two different CD singles and a 12-inch single, titled "Sanctuary MCMXCIII". The "Sundance" remix was remixed by Butch Vig who previously had produced Nirvana's Nevermind album. The "Dog Star Rising" remix was remixed by Youth who produced the Cult's eighth album, Born into This.

In 2009, two more previously unreleased versions, a demo and the "Olympic Rough Mix" were included in a 4-disc box set of the Omnibus edition of Love.

Track listings

Original version
7-inch single
A. "She Sells Sanctuary"
B. "No.13"

UK 12-inch single
A1. "She Sells Sanctuary" (long version)
B1. "The Snake"
B2. "No.13"

"Sanctuary MCMXCIII"

UK CD1
 "She Sells Sanctuary" (original) (mix by Steve Brown)
 "She Sells Sanctuary" (Dog Star Rising) (remix by Youth)
 "She Sells Sanctuary" (Phlegmatic) (remix by J.G. Thirwell)
 "She Sells Sanctuary" (Flusteresqueish) (remix by J.G. Thirwell)

UK CD2
 "She Sells Sanctuary" (Dog Star Radio) (remix by Youth)
 "She Sells Sanctuary" (Sundance) (remix by Butch Vig)
 "She Sells Sanctuary" (Slutnostic) (remix by J.G. Thirwell)
 "She Sells Sanctuary" (Lakeland live)

UK 12-inch single
A1. "She Sells Sanctuary" (Dog Star Rising) (remix by Youth)
A2. "She Sells Sanctuary" (original) (mix by Steve Brown)
B1. "She Sells Sanctuary" (Slutnostic) (remix by J.G. Thirwell)
B2. "She Sells Sanctuary" (Sundance) (remix by Butch Vig)

Australian CD single
 "She Sells Sanctuary" (original) (mix by Steve Brown)
 "She Sells Sanctuary" (Sundance) (remix by Butch Vig)
 "She Sells Sanctuary" (Phlegmatic) (remix by J.G. Thirwell)
 "She Sells Sanctuary" (Flusteresqueish) (remix by J.G. Thirwell)

Australian cassette single
 "She Sells Sanctuary" (Dog Star radio mix) (remix by Youth)
 "She Sells Sanctuary" (original version) (mix by Steve Brown)

Charts

Original version

"Sanctuary MCMXCIII"

Certifications

References

The Cult songs
1985 singles
1985 songs
Beggars Banquet Records singles
Songs written by Billy Duffy
Songs written by Ian Astbury
Gothic rock songs
Post-punk songs